Lethrinus atkinsoni is a species of emperor fish described by Alvin Seale in 1910. It is commonly 30 to 35 cm long with a bluish-grey, yellowish, or tan in colour, and a white belly. This species is widespread throughout the west Pacific Ocean. It is a reef-associated fish and is non-migratory. It is solitary or is found in small schools, and lives in seagrass beds and over the sandy bottoms feeding on plankton, mollusks, crustaceans, and other fishes. This fish is caught by humans for food, but less so than other species in the genus due to its small size.

Common names
Common names include the following, or variants thereof:
 Atkinson's emperor
 Pacific yellowtail emperor
 Reticulated emperor
 Tamure
 Tricky snapper
 Tuamotu emperor
 Yellow morwong
 Yellowtailed emperor

Description
The upper sides of this species may be bluish-grey, yellowish, or tan in colour. The belly is white. There is sometimes an indistinct area of yellow on the caudal peduncle. The head is brown, has a moderately blunt and short snout, with reddish lips. The fins may be reddish, orange, or yellowish and are pale. The edges of the fins are commonly reddish. This fish grows to approximately 40 to 50 cm, but is commonly 30 to 35 cm in length.

This species has been mistaken for Lethrinus mahsena, however, they are different in numerous, consistent ways, including colour, the shape of the body, and in meristic counts.

Distribution
This species is widespread throughout the west Pacific Ocean, and is known to live in the waters of Indonesia, the Philippines, New Caledonia, and Japan.

Habitat
Lethrinus atkinsoni is a reef-associated fish, and is non-migratory. It lives in seagrass beds and over the sandy bottoms of lagoons and the outer slopes of coral reefs. It is found in depths of between 0 and 30 metres, but is most commonly found between 2 and 8 metres.

Diet
This species is known to eat plankton, mollusks, crustaceans, and other fishes It may be solitary or found in schools.

Human uses
Lethrinus atkinsoni is caught as a subsistence fish, commercially, as well as by recreation fishers. Although considered desirable as food, other species in the genus are preferred due to its smaller size. It is caught mainly using handlines, by trawling, and is captured in such nets as the shore seine and gillnet. It is marketed mostly fresh, not frozen.

Parasites
As with most fish, Lethrinus atkinsoni is the host of many species of parasites. 
The diplectanid monogenean Calydiscoides rohdei  is parasitic on the gills. 
The gills also harbour unidentified gnathiid isopod larvae. 
The digestive tract harbours several species of digeneans, including the opecoelids Macvicaria macassarensis and Neolebouria sp. and the acanthocolpid Zoogonus pagrosomi and unidentified tetraphyllid cestodes. 
The abdominal cavity harbours larvae of the tetrarynch cestode Pseudogilquinia pillersi.
In New Caledonia, where its parasites were studied, Lethrinus atkinsoni has a total of six species of parasites.

References

External links
 

Lethrinidae
Fish described in 1910